Chicken Shoot is a video game developed by Toontraxx. It first released online in 2000 for Microsoft Windows and has since been released onto Mobile phones, Nintendo DS, Wii and Game Boy Advance.

The Windows version received positive reviews, while the Game Boy Advance version was mixed, and both the Wii and DS versions being panned by critics.

Reception

While the original 2000 PC version received positive reviews from critics and the later Game Boy Advance version receiving mixed to positive reviews, The Wii version was panned by critics as it received "generally unfavorable reviews", while the DS version received "overwhelming dislike", according to the review aggregation website Metacritic.

In 2015, GamesRadar ranked it at #62 on their list of the 100 worst games of all time. The staff suggested that it was shovelware and the worst on the Wii.

References

External links

Chicken Shoot at EBgames 

2000 video games
Fictional chickens
Game Boy Advance games
Mobile games
Nintendo DS games
Wii games
Windows games
Destination Software games
Video games about birds
Video games developed in Germany
TopWare Interactive games
Multiplayer and single-player video games
Frontline Studios games